The rufous-tailed jacamar (Galbula ruficauda) is a near-passerine bird which breeds in the tropical New World in southern Mexico, Central America and South America as far south as southern Brazil and Ecuador.

Description

Like other jacamars they are elegant, brightly coloured birds with long bills and tails. The subspecies G. r. brevirostris has, as its name implies, a shorter bill. This bird is metallic green above, and the underparts are mainly orange, including the undertail, but there is a green breast band. Sexes differ in that the male has a white throat, and the female a buff throat; she also tends to have paler underparts. The race G. r. pallens has a copper-coloured back in both sexes.

Food and foraging
This insectivore hunts from a perch, sitting with its bill tilted up, then flying out to catch flying insects. One commonly preyed upon insect is the social wasp Agelaia vicina. Other insect prey include flies, beetles, bees, dragonflies, and butterflies. Further, the bird distinguishes between edible and unpalatable butterflies mainly according to body shape.

Nesting
This species is a resident breeder in a range of dry or moist woodlands and scrub. The two to four rufous-spotted white eggs are laid in a burrow in a bank or termite mound.

Vocalizations
The rufous-tailed jacamar's call is a sharp , and the song a high thin , ending in a trill.

Bibliography

References

External links

Rufous-tailed jacamar videos, photos & sounds in the Internet Bird Collection
Rufous-tailed jacamar photo gallery VIREO
Stamps (for British Honduras-(Belize), Guyana, and Nicaragua)
Photo-High Res; Article, Tsgcs.co.uk

rufous-tailed jacamar
Birds of Central America
Birds of Mexico
Birds of Colombia
Birds of Venezuela
Birds of the Guianas
Birds of Trinidad and Tobago
Birds of Bolivia
Birds of Brazil
Birds of the Amazon Basin
rufous-tailed jacamar
rufous-tailed jacamar